Pomade acne occurs when some of the pomade (hairstyling product) that is applied to the scalp is also applied to the forehead and is responsible for the development of multiple, closely packed comedones close to the hairline.

See also 
 List of cutaneous conditions

References 

Acneiform eruptions